Acrisure is a financial technology and insurance company headquartered in Grand Rapids, Michigan. The company was initially created to acquire insurance companies in the Midwestern United States and has since expanded nationally. In 2022, Business Insurance recognized Acrisure as the 8th largest insurance broker in the world.

History 
In 2005, Acrisure was founded by Greg Williams and Ricky Norris. In 2013, Genstar Capital purchased Acrisure and much of the company's growth was accounted by acquisitions; in 2014 the company acquired 23 firms and in 2015, it took over 59 other agencies compared to 26 acquisitions between 2005 and 2013. The majority of Acrisure's trade – 60% of deals – come from existing entities it acquired, with the company's chief financial officer Dave Tuit stating "We find successful agencies, buy them and they become an agency partner." In October 2016, Acrisure's management purchased back ownership of the company from Genstar Capital.

Blackstone Inc provided funding to Acrisure in December 2018. In 2019, the company was 84% employee-owned and after acquiring Pittsburgh-based Tulco Labs in 2020, began to organize Altway, an artificial intelligence insurance platform. By 2021, the company acquired 155 firms that year, generating $2.82 billion of revenue and experiencing 42.7% growth. Acrisure was granted naming rights for the newly-constructed Acrisure Arena in Palm Desert, California in January 2022. 

In June 2022, the Abu Dhabi Investment Authority (ADIA) funded $725 million in series B-2 stock funds to Acrisure, with the company being valued at $23 billion at the time. In July 2022, Acrisure was granted naming rights for Acrisure Stadium (previously known as Heinz Field) in Pittsburgh, Pennsylvania, home to the Pittsburgh Steelers. 

In July 2022, Acrisure acquired two managed service providers, ITS Inc. and Catalyst Technology Group. 

In October 2022, Acrisure acquired top-rated NYC-based managed service provider Homefield IT (formerly ManhattanTechSupport.com)

References 

Organizations based in Grand Rapids, Michigan
Financial services companies of the United States